Taj Rossi (foaled 1970) was a champion Australian Thoroughbred racehorse.

Background
Taj Rossi was sired by Matrice from the mare Dark Queen. He was trained throughout his career by Bart Cummings who bought him at the 1972 Adelaide yearling sales.

Racing career
During the Spring of 1973 as a three-year-old his career blossomed winning the Ascot Vale Stakes, Carrum Handicap, Moonee Valley Stakes, Cox Plate, Victoria Derby and the Sandown Guineas.

This string of victories earned Taj Rossi the title of Australian Racehorse of the Year in 1973.

A virus had troubled the horse throughout his career which eventuated in his retirement from the racetrack at the age of four.

Stud record
He spent two years at stud in America where he had moderate success before returning to Australia to continue stud duties. Amongst his stakes winners were Taj Eclipse (Victoria Oaks) and Merimbula Bay (AJC Doncaster Handicap).

The horse died in 1986 at the age of 15.

External links
Australian Racing Museum Fact Sheet

1970 racehorse births
1986 racehorse deaths
Cox Plate winners
Victoria Derby winners
Thoroughbred family 5-d
Racehorses bred in Australia
Racehorses trained in Australia